Opisthotropis daovantieni, Tien's mountain stream snake, is a species of natricine snake found in Vietnam.

References

Opisthotropis
Reptiles described in 1998
Reptiles of Vietnam